The fifth season of Teen Wolf, an American supernatural drama created by Jeff Davis and to some extent based on the 1985 film of the same name, received an order of 20 episodes on June 24, 2014, and premiered on June 29, 2015. The second episode aired the day after, on June 30, 2015, then returned to the regular schedule on Mondays.

The first ten episodes of the season premiered in June 2015, with the second half of the season premiering on January 5, 2016. The entire season concluded on March 8, 2016. However, unlike the third season, the twenty episodes featured the same story arc. Several cast changes occurred, with Dylan Sprayberry becoming a series regular as Liam Dunbar, while Tyler Hoechlin left the show to pursue film roles.

Cast

Main
 Tyler Posey as Scott McCall
 Dylan O'Brien as Stiles Stilinski
 Holland Roden as Lydia Martin
 Shelley Hennig as Malia Tate
 Arden Cho as Kira Yukimura
 Dylan Sprayberry as Liam Dunbar

Recurring and guest

Episodes

Production
The series was renewed for a fifth season for a two-part 20-episode run on June 24, 2014. However, unlike the third season, it remained as a single 20-episode arc. Filming began on February 9, 2015. Season 5 premiered on June 29, 2015. Filming for the second part of Season 5 began on August 24, 2015. The second half of Season 5 premiered on January 5, 2016, and concluded on March 8, 2016.

On September 11, 2014, Holland Roden revealed that "you're going to have to tune in for season five to see if we're all coming back or not. That's just reality... It's sort of a toss up of who is not coming back for season five, but somebody is not coming back." Tyler Hoechlin was the major cast member who left the series. Dylan Sprayberry disclosed to Hollywood Life that "Liam will get a love interest next season". He also said Season 5 will see more of the friendship of Liam and Mason.

Of the season, Tyler Posey said "It's going to be badass. Like, it's another thing we haven't done before. I'm really excited. It's cool because I know nothing about the season, I only know one part of it. But it's so badass that I would watch the entire season just for this one part." Jeff Davis teased that there will be more complex mythology. Furthermore, Posey joined the production team as a co-producer.

On December 27, 2014, Davis posted a picture on Instagram of the front page of the season's first episode's script, written by himself and titled "Creatures of the Night".

In January 2015, Teen Wolf launched a competition where fans could enter their original creature designs on Tumblr using the tag #TWCreatureFeature with the winner getting their creature brought to life in Season 5. The contest ended February 4, 2015 and the winner was announced March 9, 2015. The winning design will be introduced in the first few episodes of Season 5, with the name Slaugh, the creature can reportedly "eat the souls of the innocent. He can also leave a portion of his soul inside the bodies of his victims". On May 9, 2015, it was announced that Slaugh will be portrayed by Michael Lynch.

Steven Brand was added to the cast as a new villain, Dr. Valack. On February 10, 2015, Cody Christian was cast as Theo, "a lone wolf who is drawn to town in search of a pack. He's described as athletic and charming yet covert, and while it may appear that the young adult is new to town, his past might suggest otherwise". On March 7, 2015, Orny Adams revealed at a Teen Wolf convention that he would not be returning for the fifth season due to scheduling conflicts. On March 11, 2015, it was announced that Tyler Hoechlin would not be returning at all. On May 12, 2015, Michael Johnston was cast in as Corey, reported to appear as Mason's lover. On March 12, 2015, Sprayberry revealed that his character's love interest would be played by Victoria Moroles. On November 11, 2015, Davis confirmed that Adams would return in the second part of Season 5. On January 7, 2016, it was announced that Crystal Reed would be returning to the show for a guest appearance playing a different character.

Reception
The review aggregator website Rotten Tomatoes reported an approval rating of 92% and an average rating of 6.01/10 for the fifth season, based on 12 reviews. The website's critics consensus reads, "Teen Wolf rebounds from a case of the narrative shakes by doubling down on the absurdity in a season that goes for broke with narrative irreverence and campy thrills."

Awards and nominations

References

2015 American television seasons
2016 American television seasons
Teen Wolf (2011 TV series)
Split television seasons
Celtic mythology in popular culture
Japanese mythology in popular culture
Norse mythology in popular culture